Pollatschek is a surname. Notable people with the surname include:

 John Pollatschek (born 1943), Scottish footballer
 Susanne Pollatschek (born 1977), Scottish actress